The Omar Mahamoud ( _so. "Cumar maxamuud", _ar. عمر محمود) is a Somali sub-clan, part of the Mohamud Saleeban, itself a part of the Majeerteen sub-clan of the Harti conglomeration of Darod clans. The Omar Mahamoud is the largest of the Majeerteen sub-clans. The Omar Mahamoud clan primarily inhabits the Mudug and southern Nugaal regions of Puntland in northern Somalia. a large number of the clan settle in Doollo region of ogadenia, as well as in the port city of Kismayo and the Jubbada Hoose (Lower Juba) region of southern Somalia.

References 

Somali clans